Östergötland County is one of the 29 multi-member constituencies of the Riksdag, the national legislature of Sweden. The constituency was established in 1970 when the Riksdag changed from a bicameral legislature to a unicameral legislature. It is conterminous with the county of Östergötland. The constituency currently elects 14 of the 349 members of the Riksdag using the open party-list proportional representation electoral system. At the 2022 general election it had 356,210 registered electors.

Electoral system
Östergötland County currently elects 14 of the 349 members of the Riksdag using the open party-list proportional representation electoral system. Constituency seats are allocated using the modified Sainte-Laguë method. Only parties that that reach the 4% national threshold and parties that receive at least 12% of the vote in the constituency compete for constituency seats. Supplementary leveling seats may also be allocated at the constituency level to parties that reach the 4% national threshold.

Election results

Summary

(Excludes leveling seats)

Detailed

2020s

2022
Results of the 2022 general election held on 11 September 2022:

The following candidates were elected:
 Constituency seats - Johan Andersson (S), 1,761 votes; Jonas Andersson (SD), 151 votes; Clara Aranda (SD), 232 votes; Teresa Carvalho (S), 2,521 votes; Muharrem Demirok (C), 1,158 votes; Rebecka Le Moine (MP), 1,199 votes; Eva Lindh (S), 819 votes; Johan Löfstrand (S), 857 votes; Andreas Norlén (M), 5,208 votes; Magnus Oscarsson (KD), 883 votes; Sven-Olof Sällström (SD), 1 vote; John Weinerhall (M), 500 votes; Linda Westerlund Snecker (V), 1,188 votes; and John Widegren (M), 727 votes.
 Leveling seats - Juno Blom (L), 740 votes; Aron Emilsson (SD), 40 votes; and Mattias Ottosson (S), 606 votes.

2010s

2018
Results of the 2018 general election held on 9 September 2018:

The following candidates were elected:
 Constituency seats - Johan Andersson (S), 2,110 votes; Jonas Andersson (SD), 132 votes; Juno Blom (L), 1,350 votes; Teresa Carvalho (S), 2,911 votes; Magnus Ek (C), 1,135 votes; Jörgen Grubb (SD); Eva Lindh (S), 1,235 votes; Johan Löfstrand (S), 1,482 votes; Betty Malmberg (M), 317 votes; Andreas Norlén (M), 3,154 votes; Magnus Oscarsson (KD), 1,233 votes; John Weinerhall (M), 592 votes; Linda Westerlund Snecker (V), 1,232 votes; and Markus Wiechel (SD), 52 votes.
 Leveling seats - Rebecka Le Moine (MP), 1,063 votes; and Mattias Ottosson (S), 786 votes.

2014
Results of the 2014 general election held on 14 September 2014:

The following candidates were elected:
 Constituency seats - Johan Andersson (S), 2,699 votes; Finn Bengtsson (M), 1,448 votes; Teresa Carvalho (S), 3,207 votes; Lena Ek (C), 1,560 votes; Runar Filper (SD), 2 votes; Annika Lillemets (MP), 821 votes; Johan Löfstrand (S), 1,437 votes; Peter Lundgren (SD), 28 votes; Betty Malmberg (M), 494 votes; Andreas Norlén (M), 2,152 votes; Magnus Oscarsson (KD), 926 votes; Mattias Ottosson (S), 871 votes; Anna-Lena Sörenson (S), 702 votes; and Mathias Sundin (FP), 768 votes.
 Leveling seats - Linda Snecker (V), 705 votes.

2010
Results of the 2010 general election held on 19 September 2010:

The following candidates were elected:
 Constituency seats - Thoralf Alfsson (SD), 16 votes; Johan Andersson (S), 1,741 votes; Yvonne Andersson (KD), 1,096 votes; Gunnar Axén (M), 1,369 votes; Finn Bengtsson (M), 1,351 votes; Gunilla Carlsson (M), 4,559 votes; Staffan Danielsson (C), 1,660 votes; Karin Granbom Ellison (FP), 847 votes; Billy Gustafsson (S), 630 votes; Annika Lillemets (MP), 1,057 votes; Johan Löfstrand (S), 2,410 votes; Louise Malmström (S), 2,626 votes; Andreas Norlén (M), 904 votes; and Anna-Lena Sörenson (S), 696 votes.
 Leveling seats - Torbjörn Björlund (V), 385 votes.

2000s

2006
Results of the 2006 general election held on 17 September 2006:

The following candidates were elected:
 Constituency seats - Yvonne Andersson (KD), 1,301 votes; Gunnar Axén (M), 2,367 votes; Torbjörn Björlund (V), 349 votes; Gunilla Carlsson (M), 2,306 votes; Staffan Danielsson (C), 1,510 votes; Peter Eriksson (MP), 1,215 votes; Karin Granbom (FP), 780 votes; Billy Gustafsson (S), 1,245 votes; Sonia Karlsson (S), 1,595 votes; Johan Löfstrand (S), 1,696 votes; Anne Ludvigsson (S), 713 votes; Betty Malmberg (M), 414 votes; Louise Malmström (S), 2,220 votes; and Andreas Norlén (M), 1,096 votes.
 Leveling seats - Aleksander Gabelic (S), 581 votes.

2002
Results of the 2002 general election held on 15 September 2002:

The following candidates were elected:
 Constituency seats - Yvonne Andersson (KD), 1,682 votes; Sven Brus (KD), 1,142 votes; Britt-Marie Danestig (V), 720 votes; Linnéa Darell (FP), 1,287 votes; Lena Ek (C), 2,220 votes; Karin Granbom (FP), 1,281 votes; Helena Hillar Rosenqvist (MP), 235 votes; Sonia Karlsson (S), 1,737 votes; Anna Lindgren (M), 2,424 votes; Johan Löfstrand (S), 1,105 votes; Anne Ludvigsson (S), 635 votes; Louise Malmström (S), 2,917 votes; Conny Öhman (S), 1,349 votes; Berndt Sköldestig (S), 1,890 votes; and Per Unckel (M), 2,687 votes.
 Leveling seats - Gunnar Axén (M), 1,248 votes; and Billy Gustafsson (S), 585 votes.

1990s

1998
Results of the 1998 general election held on 20 September 1998:

The following candidates were elected:
 Constituency seats - Yvonne Andersson (KD), 670 votes; Gunnar Axén (M), 1,455 votes; Inge Carlsson (S), 810 votes; Britt-Marie Danestig (V), 1,302 votes; Lena Ek (C), 2,206 votes; Dan Ericsson (KD), 575 votes; Viola Furubjelke (S), 880 votes; Stefan Hagfeldt (M), 3,783 votes; Helena Hillar Rosenqvist (MP), 197 votes; Sonia Karlsson (S), 2,453 votes; Maj-Inger Klingvall (S), 2,891 votes; Conny Öhman (S), 1,916 votes; Berndt Sköldestig (S), 826 votes; Per Unckel (M), 3,742 votes; and Carlinge Wisberg (V), 648 votes.
 Leveling seats - Karl-Göran Biörsmark (FP), 792 votes; and Carl G. Nilsson (M), 1,156 votes.

1994
Results of the 1994 general election held on 18 September 1994:

1991
Results of the 1991 general election held on 15 September 1991:

1980s

1988
Results of the 1988 general election held on 18 September 1988:

1985
Results of the 1985 general election held on 15 September 1985:

1982
Results of the 1982 general election held on 19 September 1982:

1970s

1979
Results of the 1979 general election held on 16 September 1979:

1976
Results of the 1976 general election held on 19 September 1976:

1973
Results of the 1973 general election held on 16 September 1973:

1970
Results of the 1970 general election held on 20 September 1970:

References

Riksdag constituency
Riksdag constituencies
Riksdag constituencies established in 1970